The Eureka Rebellion was a series of events on the Victorian goldfields from 1851 to 1854. It culminated in the Battle of the Eureka Stockade fought between miners and the colonial forces of Australia at Ballarat on 3 December 1854.

Eureka Stockade may also refer to:

Eureka Stockade (1907 film), a 1907 Australian silent film
Eureka Stockade (1949 film), a 1949 British film
Eureka Stockade  (miniseries), a 1984 Australian miniseries